Stanford Plateau is an icecapped plateau, over 3,000 m high and 15 nautical miles (28 km) wide, between the heads of Leverett and Kansas Glaciers. The plateau unites with the interior ice sheet to the south, but terminates to the north in the Watson Escarpment. Mapped by United States Geological Survey (USGS) from ground surveys and U.S. Navy air photos, 1960–63. It was named by the Advisory Committee on Antarctic Names (US-ACAN) for Stanford University which has sent a number of researchers to study Antarctica.

See also
McLean Peak, a peak, 2,290 metres (7,500 ft) high, surmounting a spur descending from the northwest end of Stanford Plateau

References

External links

Plateaus of Antarctica
Landforms of Marie Byrd Land